Jægersborg station is a station on the Hillerød radial of the S-train network in Copenhagen, Denmark, served by the E and A-train.
It is also the southern terminus of the Nærumbanen local railway.

There are two distinct sets of platforms for each service. The S-train has double tracks and an island platform. Although there are two tracks with platforms on either side for the local Nærumbanen service, because it is the terminus of the single track line, only the closer southerly platform is regularly used.

See also
 List of railway stations in Denmark

References 

S-train (Copenhagen) stations
Railway stations opened in 1936
1936 establishments in Denmark
Knud Tanggaard Seest railway stations
Railway stations in Denmark opened in the 20th century